European Ultimate Federation (EUF) is the governing body for the sport of Ultimate in Europe. As part of the EFDF and the World Flying Disc Federation the EUF works for the coordination and development of Ultimate in Europe and the promotion of its Spirit of the Game ideals.
The EUF coordinates Ultimate associations in Europe, and supports Ultimate in countries where there are no local organization. The EUF organizes tournaments for European teams, develops educational programs and courses for them, and support other activities of interest. Its board of directors is elected every two years, the latest election took place in October 2014.

History
The EUF in certain way is the proactive continuation of the European Flying Disc Federation (EFDF). The EUF was conceived in 2007 out of the need of the European national ultimate associations to have a professional and most of all transparent coordinating body. Formally founded in 2009 under the WFDF, and later under the newly formed EFDF, in the past few years the EUF has evolved to meet and foster changes in the fast-growing ultimate community, while staying true to upholding the ideals of Spirit of the Game. The EUF for instance coordinates youth summer camps and Train-the-Trainer weekends, but most of all the federation focuses on organizing its big championship events.

Since 2009 the federation has had the same board of directors. EUF has a very active chairman in Andra ´Oddi´ Furlan (AUT), its treasurer is Ted Beute (NED) and the secretary is Alia Ayub (GBR). Further proactive member of the board has always been Christoph Dehnhardt (GER) who chairs the Youth Committee. Since October 2018 the board consists of six more members, they are all directors-at-large responsible for their own topic. Dario Lucisano (ITA) for Spirit of the Game, Haude Hermand (FRA) for Women´s ultimate, Marco Barattini (ITA) for Men´s ultimate, Gabriele Sani (ITA) for social media and Karolis Novikovas (LTU) for livestreams. Every year (during one of the big events) the board holds it General Assemblee where all the European federations are invited to control the board´s actions and vote on new proposals.

Upcoming Sanctioned Events
European Ultimate Indoor Club Championships 2020 (EUICC 2020) in Herning, Denmark. 30 January – 2 February 2020

European Beach Ultimate Club Championships (EBUCC) in Praia da Rocha Portimao, Portugal, 15 May – 17 May 2020 

European Ultimate Championships Finals 2020 (EUCF 2020) in Bruges, Belgium, 2 October – 4 October 2020

European Ultimate Indoor Championships 2021 (EUIC 2021) in Herning, Denmark. 28 January – 31 January 2021

European Championship Events
The biggest task of the EUF is to organize the great championship events over the year. Yearly there is a club championship, called EUCS. That starts with regional tournaments in five regions and culminates in one big final event come October. Besides the federation used to organize championships for players Under17 and Under20 every year, but these big youth tournaments have changed into a biannual setup (EYUC). 

The most important tournament of the EUF is the European Ultimate Championships (EUC) that take place every four year. EUC is a competition for national teams and already started in 1980 in Paris. Therefore it´s the oldest international ultimate tournament that still exists. Until 2015 in Copenhague - Denmark the EUC also had Masters divisions, but as of 2019 the European federation has separated the three main divisions from the Masters. In June 2019 in Gyor - Hungary the EUC will consist of the divisions Men, Mixed and Women, while for the first time in history the European Masters half October will have their own tournament in Madrid - Spain (EMUC).

European Ultimate Championships Series (EUCS)
Europe has been divided into five geographic regions : North, East, Central, West, South. Each nation (or group of nations if they are very small) may send a maximum number of qualified teams to its European Ultimate Club Regional (EUCR) tournament in all three divisions.

The ideal entry to an EUCR would be from a country’s nationals results. However a National Federation may also nominate its EUCR candidates. These teams compete at the EUCR´s to advance to the European Club Finals (EUCF).
The EUCF is Europe's premier club competition and it is held annually. At the Finals there are currently 24 Men´s teams, 12 Women´s teams and 12 Mixed teams. Starting in Bruges 2020 the number of Women´s teams will be elevated to 16.

On 13 November 2019, EUF announced that the 2020 EUCF would see the Women's division increased to 16 teams, keeping the size of the other divisions unchanged: Men - 24 teams; Mixed - 12 teams.

European Ultimate Club Finals (EUCF)

Performance by country:

Total (excluding Masters division):

Women's Division:

Open Division:

Mixed:

European Ultimate Youth Championships (EUYC)

Since 2003 first EFDF and since 2009 the European Ultimate Federation has been organizing an annual event for teams of players under 20 and under 17, the European Youth Ultimate Championship (EYUC). In the even years the EYUC only had two divisions, only the U17 divisions, because those years the U20 teams would be at World Junior Ultimate Championships (WJUC). In 2014 and 2016 the name of the tournament changed to Open European Youth Ultimate Championship (OEYUC) when Colombia took part. Since 2017 EYUC is biannual and in 2019 the tournament for the first time had a fifth division, a pilot of an U20 Mixed category won by a dominant Latvia.
The purpose of EYUC is to offer younger players the opportunity to be seen on a European stage and demonstrate how much the sport has grown in the younger age brackets. Since the first edition held in Tallinn - Estonia in 2003 which only had several U20 teams in two divisions, the last tournament in 2019 in Wroclaw-Poland has grown to include 16 U20 Men's teams, 12 U20 Women´s teams, 7 U20 Mixed teams, 16 U20 Women´s teams and 9 U17 Women's teams (60 squads in total) for over 1200 playing participants.

European Ultimate Championships (EUC)

The European Ultimate Championships are the continental ultimate competition for national teams. The first EUC was in 1980 in Paris - France with seven teams in only one division, Finland crowned as Open champions, followed by an edition in 1981 in Milan - Italy with eight countries, Sweden being Open champions. Also the following seven editions of 1982 (Obertraun - Austria), 1985 (Obertraun - Austria), 1987 (Cologne - Germany), 1989 (Vejle - Denmark ), 1991 (Colchester - UK), 1993 (Arnhem - Netherlands) and 1995 (Fontenay-le-Comte - France) were won by Sweden, while the number of participating Open teams never exceeded eleven. All these first tournaments were organized by EFDF, but when in 1997 (Millfield - UK) only five Open teams took part, something had to be done. The World Flying Disc Federation (WFDF) recognized that the year was too full with championships and decided to change the setup of all its big events into a four-year-cycle. The next EUC was in 2003 (Fontenay-le-Comte - France) with again eleven participating nations in the Open division, but EUC Southampton in 2007 was a big success with seventeen Open teams. From 2011 in Maribor - Slovenia the EUF was responsible for the organization and until 2019 the -now- Men´s division has grown into a competition with twenty national teams.

Already during the third tournament in 1982 in Obertraun there was a Women´s division at EUC as well, albeit with only three national teams, Finland crowned champions. The following editions the number of participating Women´s teams rose steadily, although until 2003 it never surpassed the number of nine. Then in 2007 Southampton also the Women´s competition exploded with fourteen entrees. The best Women´s attendance knew 2015 Copenhague with nineteen , but in Gyor it dropped again to fifteen. From 2003 in Fontenay-le-Comte the EUC also had a Mixed division, starting with eight squads. The Mixed participation rose quickly over the years with eighteen national teams in Copenhagen and even nineteen in Gyor in 2019.

See also
EUF (disambiguation)

References

External links
Official website of the European Flying Disc Federation

International sports organizations
Ultimate (sport) governing bodies
Non-profit organizations based in Europe